Halolaguna sanmaru is a moth in the family Lecithoceridae. It is found in Thailand.

References

Moths described in 2011
Halolaguna